"Alive" is the debut solo single by Australian recording artist and actress Natalie Bassingthwaighte. It was released on 14 October 2008, as the first single from her debut solo album 1000 Stars. The song's musical-genre is pop and its lyrics describe being free, taking chances and making love. Upon its release, "Alive" peaked at number eight on the ARIA Singles Chart and was certified platinum by the Australian Recording Industry Association for sales exceeding 70,000 copies.

"Alive" was written by Bassingthwaighte, Arnthor Birgisson and Andrew Frampton in Los Angeles, during the last week Bassingthwaighte was writing songs for 1000 Stars. It was also her last writing session with Birgisson and Frampton. Bassingthwaighte stated that it was really hard to write "Alive" because they wanted to write something that was "just fun" because she felt a song like that was missing from the album. The music video was directed by Anthony Rose and features Bassingthwaighte dressed in multiple outfits and wigs.

Release and reception
"Alive" was released as a digital download on 14 October 2008. On 10 November 2008, it was released as a digital extended play (EP) which included the B-side song "Remember Me" and an Electrodex remix of "Alive". The EP was later released as a CD on 15 November 2008. "Alive" was released as a digital download for SingStar via the PlayStation Network in November 2009.

Upon its release, "Alive" debuted at number 39 on the ARIA Singles Chart on 27 October 2008. Twelve weeks later it peaked at number eight. The song was certified platinum by the Australian Recording Industry Association for sales exceeding 70,000 copies. "Alive" also reached number six on the ARIA Physical Singles Chart, number two on the ARIA Australian Artists Singles Chart and number seven on the ARIA Digital Tracks Chart.

Music video

The music video for "Alive" was directed by Anthony Rose and filmed on 20 October 2008. The video features Bassingthwaighte dressed in multiple outfits and wigs. It begins with Bassingthwaighte sitting on a purple chair wearing a blond wig. She is then shown in a black and red dress dancing in front of a black background. The third sequence of the video was filmed in black and white and features Bassingthwaighte wearing an afro. This is followed by scenes of her on a swing wearing a red wig and dancing with two male dancers (brothers Hilton and David Denis who featured in So You Think You Can Dance Australia). The video premiered in Australia on 6 November 2008.

Live performances
Bassingthwaighte premiered "Alive" during a performance at the Nickelodeon Australian Kids' Choice Awards 2008 held in Melbourne on 11 October 2008. In October 2008, she performed the song at the after-party for the stage show Priscilla, Queen of the Desert. Bassingthwaighte also performed "Alive" during Australia's 2009 New Year's Eve party in Sydney.

Formats and track listings
Digital download
 "Alive" – 3:31

CD / Digital EP
 "Alive" – 3:30
 "Remember Me" – 4:32
 "Alive" (Electrodex remix) – 4:31

Credits and personnel
Credits adapted from the liner notes of 1000 Stars.

Locations
Recorded at Chalice Studios and Henson Studios in Los Angeles.
Mixed at The Vault Studios in Stockholm.
Mastered at Sterling Sound in New York City.

Personnel
Songwriting – Natalie Bassingthwaighte, Arnthor Birgisson, Andrew Frampton
Production – Arnthor Birgisson, Andrew Frampton
Mixing – Arnthor Birgisson
Recording – Deyder Cintron
Guitars – Esbjorn Ohrwall, Max Martin
Programming – Arnthor Birgisson
All vocals – Natalie Bassingthwaighte
Mastering – Leon Zervos

Charts

Weekly charts

Year-end charts

Certifications

Release history

References

External links
 "Alive" music video
 "Alive" music video at YouTube

2008 songs
2008 debut singles
Natalie Bassingthwaighte songs
Songs written by Natalie Bassingthwaighte
Songs written by Arnthor Birgisson
Songs written by Andrew Frampton (songwriter)
Sony BMG singles
Sony Music Australia singles